Anthonomus rubi, the strawberry-blossom weevil or strawberry blossom weevil, is a species of weevil found in Europe and western Asia. It feeds on plants of the family Rosaceae and is an important pest of strawberry (Fragaria × ananassa Duchesne) and raspberry (Rubus idaeus L.). This insect is a particularly problematic pest of strawberry in Europe, in some cases responsible for up to 80% loss of the berry crop.

Ecology and description
Adults feed on strawberry foliage, and females lay eggs inside unopened flower buds (one egg per bud) before partially or totally severing the stalk; larvae develop inside the severed buds, feeding on the wilting tissue.

Role of pheromones 
Adults are thought to be attracted to strawberries by chemicals released by the plants. Monoterpenes, sesquiterpenes, and aromatic compounds acted as odorants (attractors) on weevils' receptor neurons. Male A. rubi then release their own blend of aggregation pheromone, three components of which have been shown to attract weevils to baited traps.

See also 
 Anthonomus signatus (Strawberry bud weevil)

References 

Curculioninae
Strawberry pests
Beetles of Asia
Beetles of Europe
Beetles described in 1795
Taxa named by Johann Friedrich Wilhelm Herbst